Naka River may refer to:

中川
Naka River (Saitama Tokyo) which flows through Saitama prefecture and Tokyo prefecture
Naka River (Chiba) which flows through Chiba prefecture

那珂川
Naka River (Tochigi Ibaraki) which flows through Tochigi prefecture and Ibaraki prefecture
Naka River (Fukuoka) which flows through Fukuoka prefecture

那賀川
Naka River (Tokushima) which flows through Tokushima prefecture

See also 
 Naka (disambiguation)